August Strömberg (born 28 February 1992) is a Swedish football goalkeeper who plays for Kongsvinger.

Club career 
On 26 July 2020, Strömberg scored his first career goal in a 2020 Allsvenskan game for Varberg against IF Elfsborg that finished 3–3. On 3 August 2021, he signed for Norwegian Second Division club Kongsvinger. On 7 July 2022, he scored his second career goal in a 2022 Norwegian First Division game against Bryne that finished 1–1.

References

1992 births
Living people
Swedish footballers
Swedish expatriate footballers
Association football goalkeepers
Qviding FIF players
IFK Göteborg players
Degerfors IF players
Ljungskile SK players
Gefle IF players
Varbergs BoIS players
Kongsvinger IL Toppfotball players
Superettan players
Allsvenskan players
Norwegian Second Division players
Expatriate footballers in Norway
Swedish expatriate sportspeople in Norway
Footballers from Gothenburg